Courting Disaster may refer to:

 Courting Disaster (comic), a webcomic by Brad Guigar
 Courting Disaster (novel), a Nancy Drew and Hardy Boys novel
 "Courting Disaster!" (The Raccoons), an episode of The Raccoons
 "Courting Disaster" (Will & Grace), an episode of Will & Grace